Brian Bernard James Fitzpatrick (5 March 1931 – 2 October 2006) was a New Zealand rugby union player. He played 22 matches for the All Blacks including three internationals.

References

1931 births
2006 deaths
Auckland rugby union players
New Zealand international rugby union players
New Zealand rugby union players
People educated at Gisborne Boys' High School
Poverty Bay rugby union players
Rugby union centres
Rugby union fly-halves
Rugby union players from Ōpōtiki
University of Auckland alumni
Victoria University of Wellington alumni
Wellington rugby union players